Daniel Thomas Chillingworth (born 13 September 1981) is an English footballer who plays for St. Neots Town FC.

Chillingworth was a product of the Cambridge United youth system, and after making his first team debut against Barnet in a Football League Trophy game in January 2000, he made his league debut on 1 April 2000 in a 1–0 defeat at Oldham Athletic in Division Two.

A successful loan spell with neighbours Cambridge City followed in 2001 and he also enjoyed a temporary spell with Darlington where he scored once in four appearances under former United manager Tommy Taylor. His solitary league goal for The Quakers came in a 7–1 defeat at Scunthorpe United although he did also score in an FA Cup tie for Darlington at Altrincham.

Chillingworth broke into the Cambridge team on a more permanent basis during 2001–02 and scored twice before niggling injuries began to affect his form. He failed to score at all during the following season although he did manage to score a number of goals over the next two seasons to reach a career total of 13 goals for the club in 87 appearances. Sandwiched in between was a loan spell with Leyton Orient where he scored twice in eight games.

Following Cambridge United's relegation from the Football League in 2005, Chillingworth accepted a 2-year contract with Rushden & Diamonds. At the end of his first season Rushden were also relegated from the Football League into the Nationwide Conferencec. At the time of the club's relegation, due to injury and loss of form, Chillingworth had joined Notts County on loan although hopes of a permanent deal were dashed when the Diamonds new manager wanted him back for the club's inaugural season in the Conference.

A change of manager at Rushden left Chillingworth out of favour and he jumped at the chance of a return to Cambridge United on a free transfer in January 2007. Towards the end of the season he forged a useful partnership with Robbie Simpson, to help the club avoid relegation from the Conference. He also scored his first hat-trick for the club, in the 7–0 win over Weymouth in March 2007.

In the Summer of 2007, he signed a new contract with the U's - but only after boss Jimmy Quinn had withdrawn his original offer because he thought Chillingworth was taking too long to sign.

He is currently out with an ankle injury, and has yet to feature for United in the 2007–08 season.

References

External links

1981 births
Living people
Sportspeople from Cambridge
English footballers
Cambridge City F.C. players
Leyton Orient F.C. players
Darlington F.C. players
Rushden & Diamonds F.C. players
Cambridge United F.C. players
St Albans City F.C. players
St Neots Town F.C. players
Notts County F.C. players
English Football League players
Association football forwards